Billy "Bubbles" Myers (September 7, 1923 – April 13, 2019) was a Canadian football player who played for the Toronto Argonauts. He won the Grey Cup with them in 1945 and 1946. He previously played football with the Vaughan Road Academy, University of Toronto and the Toronto Balmy Beach Beachers. After his football career, he coached football from 1955 to 1985 at Earl Haig Collegiate. Myers died in Richmond Hill, Ontario in 2019 at the age of 95.

References

1923 births
2019 deaths
Sportspeople from Saint John, New Brunswick
Toronto Argonauts players
Players of Canadian football from New Brunswick